Abdul Jabar Mohd Yusof, or more commonly known as Cikgu Jabar was a Malaysian politician and teacher. He has served as the Member of the Selangor State Legislative Assembly for Batu Laut for three consecutive terms from 1974 to 1986, becoming the first and only independent politician in Malaysian history in doing so.

Political career
Cikgu Jabar was formerly a member of UMNO before becoming an Independent politician. During his tenure as the member of the Selangor State Legislative Assembly for Batu Laut, he managed to secure the Batu Laut seat even though at that time the Alliance Party and UMNO was quite strong under the leadership of former Selangor Menteri Besar, Datuk Harun Idris. Harun Idris competed at Morib, a constituency neighboring Batu Laut. 

Cikgu Jabar is a legend in his own right, he redefined the idea of an "Independent candidate". His political career though ended after he joined the now-defunct Malaysian Nationalist Party or NASMA in 1986, losing badly to BN's Sairun Abdul Hamid.

Election results

References

Malaysian people of Malay descent
Malaysian Muslims
20th-century Malaysian politicians
Year of birth missing (living people)